El Azizia District is a district of Médéa Province, Algeria.

The district is further divided into 3 municipalities:
El Azizia
Maghraoua
Mihoub

Districts of Médéa Province